This list contains Romanian urban localities (municipalities or cities/towns) in which Roma people make up over 5% of the total population, according to the 2011 census. The Roma are an ethnic group which make up 3.3% of Romania's population. There are several rural localities (communes and villages) which also have Roma populations exceeding 5% of the total population, even though those are not listed here.

In localities where Roma make up more than 20% of the population, the Romani language can be used when addressing local authorities, while state-funded education and bilingual signs are also provided. This arrangement applies in several communes, as well as in three towns: Bechet, Budești and Ulmeni.

See also
Romani people in Romania
List of Romani settlements

References

Romanian 2002 Census Results Database

 
Roma
Romania
Romani-related lists
Romani